Hyposmocoma incongrua is a species of moth of the family Cosmopterigidae. It is endemic to the Hawaiian island of Maui. It was first described by Lord Walsingham in 1907.

External links

incongrua
Endemic moths of Hawaii
Moths described in 1907
Taxa named by Thomas de Grey, 6th Baron Walsingham